Peter Fitzhugh Brown (born February 2, 1955) is the CEO of the American hedge fund Renaissance Technologies.

Personal life and education 
Brown is a son of Henry B. R. Brown, who invented the world's first money market fund, the Reserve Fund. Brown's great-grandfather was United States federal judge Addison Brown, who was also a botanist and a founder of the New York Botanical Garden. He is also a descendent of Virginia statesman Richard Henry Lee, whose June 1776 resolution led to the United States Declaration of Independence.

Brown graduated from Harvard University with a B.A. in mathematics. He later earned a Ph.D. in computer science from Carnegie Mellon University. He married Margaret Hamburg on May 23, 1992, who would later serve as the head of the FDA under the Obama Administration. Together they have two children. Their family foundation, Quetzal Trust, has over $380 million in assets as of 2020.

Career
After graduating from Harvard, Brown joined a team at Exxon Office Systems that was working on computer systems to transcribe spoken language into computer text. In 1984 he joined the IBM speech group, working on computer software to transcribe spoken text. The group, led by Frederick Jelinek, included Robert Mercer and several other mathematicians, statisticians, and scientists.

Brown unsuccessfully urged IBM management to use the speech group's research to develop and sell new products, such as an automated service for evaluation of financial credit. He successfully convinced Abe Peled, a high-level executive in IBM's Research Division, to hire the Carnegie Mellon research team that was programming a computer to play chess. The team, working for IBM, developed Deep Blue, which defeated Garry Kasparov in a 1997 chess match.

Jim Simons offered to double Peter Brown's and Robert Mercer's IBM salaries, and they went to work for Renaissance Technologies in 1993. Brown and Mercer were responsible for hiring David Magerman in 1995. In 1995 Brown and Mercer implemented a new, improved trading system that incorporated all of the trading signals and portfolio requirements of Renaissance Technologies into a monolithic, new, and improved trading system. Soon afterward, they were promoted to senior managers and partners with percentages of the profits of Renaissance Technologies. Magerman found and fixed two serious software bugs in Brown and Mercer's trading system. In 1997 Simons gave a 10% equity stake to Henry Laufer and, later, gave sizable equity stakes to Brown, Mercer, and others. Simons thus reduced his equity stake to very slightly over 50%. As Jim Simons became more confident, he moved the firm into a new headquarters compound with a gym, lighted tennis courts, a library with a fireplace, and a large auditorium, where biweekly seminars were held.

In 2003 Simons announced that Brown and Mercer would become executive vice-presidents of the entire firm, co-managing with Simons himself. In 2010 Simons made Brown and Mercer co-CEOS and retired. In November 2017, Mercer announced that he would resign from Renaissance Technologies. Since Mercer's resignation, Brown has been the sole CEO.

White's Ferry controversy 
Brown and his sisters, Elizabeth Devlin and Harriet Dickerson, own Rockland Farm LLC in Loudoun County, Virginia, which has been in the Rust/Brown family for over 200 years.

A narrow portion of the property along the Potomac River has long been used as the Virginia-side landing of White's Ferry, an important commuting link between Loudoun County and Montgomery County in Maryland. After unauthorized expansion of the landing including a concrete retaining wall was built on the property by the operators of White's Ferry following damage from a flood, Rockland Farm LLC sued, stating the 1952 license that allowed the operators use of their property for a landing had been violated. Complicating the matter was that Loudoun County had condemned part of the Rockland Farm property for public use as a landing in 1871, but the documents defining this easement could not be found. After a court battle that lasted over a decade, Rockland Farm LLC won its case in November 2020 and White's Ferry ceased operations following a flood that snapped the cable used by the ferry to cross the river and failed negotiations to keep service operating.

In 2022, it was reported that negotiations to reopen the ferry were continuing with the new owners of the ferry service. Rockland Farm LLC has offered to purchase the Maryland landing for more than the owner paid for it to get the ferry re-opened. It has also asked to be paid an inflation adjusted per car fee of 50 cents as well as offering to go to last-best-offer binding arbitration; but the current owners have rejected all offers.

References

1955 births
Living people
20th-century American businesspeople
21st-century American businesspeople
American chief executives of financial services companies
American hedge fund managers
IBM Research computer scientists
IBM employees
Harvard College alumni
Carnegie Mellon University alumni
American computer scientists